Akademmistechko is a station on Kyiv Metro's Sviatoshynsko-Brovarska Line. The station is the western terminus of the line and was opened on May 24, 2003 as part of the western extension of the Sviatoshynsky radius.

The station is a bi-level pillar-trispan, with two balconies on the top level. Named after the nearby laboratories (literally Academical town) of the Ukrainian Academy of Sciences, and test centres, the station's design (Architects V. Gnevyshev, T. Tselikovskaya, N. Aleshkin and S. Krushinsky) is based on scientific themes. The lighting for instance consists of several chandeliers, arranged in an organic element layout with the actual lamps acting as atoms. Overall the colour tone of the station is pale white from the marble used in coating with additional yellow tints on the hemispherical balconies and the staircases. Blue rails are used for the balcony details.

Unlike other stations on the radius, Akademmistechko does not follow the Peremohy avenue but instead takes a northwards turn and is located near the intersection of Palladin avenue and Vernadsky boulevard/Uborevich street. The area receives mostly local passengers, thus avoiding unnecessary congestion with non-Kyivans that come from outside of the city via Zhytomyrska.

The station has two vestibules which are interlinked with subways on both sides of the intersection. There is also a third staircase to the balcony level from the centre of the platform. On the surface, the entrances are protected from the elements by glazed pavilions. The segment Sviatoshyn–Akademmistechko completed the development plan of the Sviatoshynsky radius; no extensions are planned after this station.

External links

 Metropoliten.kyiv.ua - Station description
 Mirmetro.net - "Akademmistechko" at "Metroworld"
 metro.zarohem.cz - Photo gallery

Kyiv Metro stations
Railway stations opened in 2003
2003 establishments in Ukraine